The Farewell is a 2019 American comedy-drama film written and directed by Lulu Wang. It stars Awkwafina, Tzi Ma, Diana Lin, and Zhao Shuzhen. The film follows a Chinese American family who, upon learning their grandmother has only a short while left to live, decide not to tell her and schedule a family gathering before she dies.

The film is based in part on director Wang's life experiences, which she first publicly discussed as part of her radio story What You Don't Know, which appeared as part of an episode of This American Life. The film was screened in the U.S. Dramatic Competition section at the 2019 Sundance Film Festival and was theatrically released in the United States on July 12, 2019, by A24. It received widespread acclaim from critics, with particular praise for Wang's screenplay and the performances of Awkwafina and Zhao Shuzhen. At the 77th Golden Globe Awards the film was nominated for two awards including Best Foreign Language Film, with Awkwafina winning for Best Actress – Musical or Comedy. The Farewell is a bilingual film in English and Mandarin Chinese.

Plot
Aspiring Chinese-American writer Billi maintains a close relationship with Nai Nai (paternal grandmother) who lives in Changchun, China. After receiving a rejection letter for a Guggenheim Fellowship, Billi discovers from her parents, Haiyan and Jian, that Nai Nai has been diagnosed with terminal lung cancer, and is predicted to have only a few months left to live.

Through deception and manipulation of medical test results, the diagnosis is kept a secret from Nai Nai herself. Nai Nai is, instead, falsely told that her recent doctor visits have only revealed benign findings. A wedding for Billi's cousin from Japan, Hao Hao, has been planned in China as an excuse to unite the family to spend what is expected to be one last time with Nai Nai. Fearing Billi will end up exposing the lie to her grandmother, Haiyan and Jian tell her to remain in New York City.

Billi disobeys her parents' orders and flies to Changchun shortly after the rest of the family arrive there. Billi assures her parents that she will not reveal the cancer diagnosis to Nai Nai. Throughout the trip, however, she clashes with the rest of the family over their deliberate dishonesty towards her grandmother. Guilt-ridden, Billi expresses conflicted thoughts with her parents over the Chinese cultural beliefs that result in a family refusing to disclose a life-threatening disease. One night, her uncle, Haibin, contends that the lie allows the family to bear the emotional burden of the diagnosis, rather than Nai Nai herself—a practice of collectivism that Haibin acknowledges differs from the individualistic values common in Western culture. Billi later learns that Nai Nai also told a similar lie to her husband up until his death when he was terminally ill.

On the day of the wedding, both Haibin and Hao Hao break down in tears on separate occasions but manage to proceed through the banquet without raising Nai Nai's suspicions. Billi intercepts Nai Nai's medical test results from the hospital and has it altered to reflect a clean bill of health, helping to maintain the lie. That night, Nai Nai gives Billi a hóngbāo, encouraging her to spend the money as she chooses. Billi admits that she wants to stay in Changchun to spend more time with Nai Nai, but Nai Nai declines, telling her that she needs to live her own life. When Billi reveals the Guggenheim Fellowship rejection to her, Nai Nai encourages Billi to keep an open mind and not get hung up on this failure, "don't be the bull endlessly ramming its horns into the corner of the room." She says that "life is not about what things one does, but more so about how one goes about doing them".

Billi keeps her promise to maintain the lie. She shares a tearful goodbye with Nai Nai as the visiting family members return to their homes in Japan and America. A title card reveals that six years after her diagnosis, the woman Nai Nai's character was based on is still alive and still unaware of her sickness.

Cast
 Awkwafina as Billi Wang
 Tzi Ma as Haiyan Wang, Billi's father
 Diana Lin as Lu Jian, Billi's mother
Zhao Shu-zhen as Nai Nai, Billi's paternal grandmother
 Lu Hong (playing herself) as Little Nai Nai, Billi's grandmother's younger sister
 Jiang Yongbo as Haibin, Haiyan's older brother
 Chen Han as Hao Hao, Haibin's son
 Aoi Mizuhara as Aiko, Hao Hao's Japanese fiancée
 Zhang Jing as Yuping, Haiyan's cousin
 Li Xiang as Aunty Ling, Haibin's wife
 Yang Xuejian as Mr. Li
 Jim Liu as Dr. Song

Production
The film was based on a story called What You Don't Know that was initially shared by Wang on This American Life in April 2016. Wang said that the film was based on her grandmother's illness, stating that "I always felt the divide in my relationship to my family versus my relationship to my classmates and to my colleagues and to the world that I inhabit. That's just the nature of being an immigrant and straddling two cultures."

The film was primarily shot in Changchun, China, over the course of 24 days in June 2018. Filming also took place in New York. In an interview with Filmmaker, cinematographer Anna Franquesa Solano stated that the references for the film included Force Majeure and Still Walking. However, she added that her main source of inspiration came from "spending time with Lulu's family at their home in Changchun, during pre-production."

Director Lulu Wang says that she kept the secret from her grandmother during and after film production. It was awkward to keep the secret when the grandmother visited the filming, a block from her home. Wang claims her grandmother eventually found out from discussing the movie with her little sister, who plays herself in the movie.

Release
The film had its premiere in the U.S. Dramatic Competition section at the 2019 Sundance Film Festival on January 25, 2019. In January 2019, A24 acquired worldwide distribution rights to the film for $7 million, over Netflix, Amazon Studios, and Fox Searchlight Pictures. It was released in the United States on July 12, 2019. A fully Mandarin-subtitled version of the film played in select theaters on September 8, 2019.

Reception

Box office
The Farewell grossed $17.7 million in the United States and Canada, and $5.4 million in other territories, for a total worldwide gross of $23.1 million, against a production budget of $3 million. In its opening weekend the film made $355,662 from four theaters for an average of $88,916 per venue; at the time, it was the best average of 2019, besting Avengers: Endgames $76,601. It expanded to 35 theaters in its second weekend and earned $1.14 million, then made $1.5 million from 135 theaters in its third. It continued to expand in the following weeks, making $2.4 million from 426 theaters and then $2.2 million from 705 theaters. The film expanded further to over 800 theaters in the next few weeks, $1.4 million from 861 theaters, $882,623 from 816 theaters and $841,414 from 891 theaters.

The Farewell was a box office "flop" in China, grossing only $580,000 by January 2020 in what was then the world's second-largest film market.

Critical response
The website's critics' consensus reads: "The Farewell deftly captures complicated family dynamics with a poignant, well-acted drama that marries cultural specificity with universally relatable themes." On Metacritic, the film has a weighted average score of 89 out of 100 based on 47 critic reviews, indicating "universal acclaim".

Eric Kohn of IndieWire gave the film an A− grade and praised Awkwafina's performance, writing, "As a Chinese-American grappling with the traditionalism of her past and its impact on the future, she's an absorbing engine for the movie's introspective look at a most unusual family reunion." Christy Lemire writing for RogerEbert.com gave the film 4 out of 4 stars, saying Zhao Shuzhen is "the most frequent source of laughs", but went on to say that "as delightful as [Zhao] is in this crucial, central role, she will also quietly rip your heart out by the film's end". Richard Lawson of Vanity Fair wrote, "Wang movingly tells not just a story about the negotiations of familial love, but also of the immigrant experience, of revisiting one's homeland to, in some senses, say goodbye to it." David Rooney of The Hollywood Reporter commented, "its moments of sweet sentimentality are fully earned and heartfelt." Brian Lowry of CNN.com described it as a "small, melancholy movie that explores cultural differences and dealing with death in an utterly charming, understated manner." Hong Kong playwright Jingan Young commented on the film's depiction of the differences between western and Chinese family values, claiming that "the family’s decision to tell a 'good lie' is a metaphor for the collective delusion of living under the Chinese Communist party."

Former United States President Barack Obama named The Farewell amongst his favorite films and television series of 2019 in an annual list released on December 29, 2019.

Awards and nominations

References

External links
 
 
 
 

2019 films
2019 comedy-drama films
2019 multilingual films
2010s English-language films
2010s Mandarin-language films
A24 (company) films
Big Beach (company) films
American multilingual films
Comedy-drama films about Asian Americans
Films about Chinese Americans
Comedy-drama films based on actual events
Films featuring a Best Musical or Comedy Actress Golden Globe winning performance
Films about cancer
Films about death
Films about families
Films about old age
Films about weddings
Films set in Jilin
Films set in New York City
Films shot in Jilin
Films shot in New York City
Independent Spirit Award for Best Film winners
This American Life
Chinese-language American films
2010s American films
2019 independent films